Dave Pascal (1918, Manhattan-3 March 2003, New York City) was an American cartoonist whose work has appeared in The New Yorker and elsewhere. He received the National Cartoonist Society Advertising and Illustration Award for 1968 and their Humor Comic Book Award for 1977.

References

External links
 Dave Pascal's biography at the NCS site

1918 births
2003 deaths
People from Manhattan
American cartoonists